Eupithecia adequata is a moth in the family Geometridae first described by Pearsall in 1910. It is found in the United States from Utah and Colorado through Nevada to California and Arizona.

The wingspan is about 21 mm. The forewings are dull whitish. The crosslines are angled sharply outward below the costa and then strongly inwardly. Adults have been recorded on wing from March to May and in July.

References

Moths described in 1910
adequata
Moths of North America